The Magic Aster (马兰花; Ma Lan Hua) is a Chinese animated film released June 19, 2009 by Shanghai Animation Film Studio, Xiamen Shangchen Science and Technology company and the Shanghai Chengtai investment management company.

Cast
The film included a notable cast of celebrities for the voice over of the on-screen characters.

References

2009 films
Chinese animated films
2009 animated films